The 2005 Tour de France was the 92nd edition of Tour de France, one of cycling's Grand Tours. The Tour began in Fromentine with an individual time trial on 2 July and Stage 12 occurred on 14 July with a hilly stage from Briançon. The race finished on the Champs-Élysées in Paris, on 24 July.

Stage 12
14 July 2005 — Briançon to Digne-les-Bains, 

This Bastille Day stage saw a large breakaway with thirteen riders (top-ten plus Giunti Massimo, Stephan Schreck and Giovanni Lombardi) that gained over four minutes on the peloton. Included were the cycling sprinters Thor Hushovd and Stuart O'Grady. The escape was disorganised, with mostly Axel Merckx trying to set the pace and organise. On the Col du Corobin it was Merckx 's task to throw the sprinters off to minimize Robbie McEwen's green jersey point loss. At the same time  in the peloton chased the sprinters. Sandy Casar escaped first on the ascent to the Col du Corobin, but is caught again. David Moncoutié tried next and manages around a 30" lead. Despite the rest chasing him he is holding them off. Moncoutié follows Richard Virenque's National Holiday stage win of last year.

Stage 13
15 July 2005 — Miramas to Montpellier,

Stage 14
16 July 2005 — Agde to Ax-3 Domaines,

Stage 15
17 July 2005 — Lézat-sur-Lèze to Saint-Lary-Soulan Pla d'Adet, 

Stage 15 recap

Stage 16
19 July 2005 — Mourenx to Pau,

Stage 17
20 July 2005 — Pau to Revel,

Stage 18
21 July 2005 — Albi to Mende,

Stage 19
22 July 2005 — Issoire to Le Puy-en-Velay,

Stage 20
23 July 2005 — Saint-Étienne to Saint-Étienne, 

Highlights:
Ivan Basso: Spent much energy in the first half of the race, which made him faster than Armstrong at the 14 km flag but in the end he was placed only fifth.
Michael Rasmussen: Defending his third place did not work out too well. Nearly everything that could fail, failed. First he slipped and fell at a rotonde after 4 km. This caused his specially calibrated bike to ride suboptimally. He demanded a new hind wheel, but instead got a whole new bike. Not happy with this bike, he had to wait for the mechanic to fix his personal bike. This caused him to panic, lose his self-confidence and his ability to cut curves. On a technical downhill part he saltoed into a ditch. In total, he changed his bike two times and his wheels two times.
Santiago Botero: Missed a curve.

Stage 21 
23 July 2005 — Corbeil-Essonnes to Paris Champs-Élysées,

References

Tour De France, Stage 12 To Stage 21, 2005
Tour de France stages